Jinyong may refer to:

 Jin Yong (Louis Cha Leung-yung, 1924–2018), a Chinese wuxia writer 
 10930 Jinyong, a minor planet
 Lee Chin-yung (born 1951), or Lǐ Jìnyǒng, a Taiwanese politician

See also 
 Jinyoung (disambiguation)
Heroes of Jin Yong, a tactical role-playing game